In cryptography, a verifiable random function (VRF) is a public-key pseudorandom function that provides proofs that its outputs were calculated correctly. The owner of the secret key can compute the function value as well as an associated proof for any input value. Everyone else, using the proof and the associated public key (or verification key), can check that this value was indeed calculated correctly, yet this information cannot be used to find the secret key. 

A verifiable random function can be viewed as a public-key analogue of a keyed cryptographic hash and as a cryptographic commitment to an exponentially large number of seemingly random bits. The concept of a verifiable random function is closely related to that of a verifiable unpredictable function (VUF), whose outputs are hard to predict but do not necessarily seem random.

The concept of a VRF was introduced by Micali, Rabin, and Vadhan in 1999. Since then, verifiable random functions have found widespread use in cryptocurrencies, as well as in proposals for protocol design and cybersecurity.

Constructions 
In 1999, Micali, Rabin, and Vadhan introduced the concept of a VRF and proposed the first such one. The original construction was rather inefficient: it first produces a verifiable unpredictable function, then uses a hard-core bit to transform it into a VRF; moreover, the inputs have to be mapped to primes in a complicated manner: namely, by using a prime sequence generator that generates primes with overwhelming probability using a probabilistic primality test.

In 2005, an efficient and practical verifiable random function was proposed by Dodis and Yampolskiy. When the input  is from a small domain (the authors then extend it to a larger domain), the function can be defined as follows:

where e(·,·) is a bilinear map. To verify whether  was computed correctly or not, one can check
To extend this to a larger domain, the authors use a tree construction and a universal hash function. This is secure if it is hard to break the "q-Diffie-Helman inversion assumption", which states that no algorithm given  can compute , and the "q-decisional bilinear Diffie-Helman inversion assumption", which states that it is impossible for an efficient algorithm given  as input to distinguish  from random, in the group .

In 2015, Hofheinz and Jager constructed a VRF which is provably secure given any member of the "(n − 1)-linear assumption family", which includes the decision linear assumption. This is the first such VRF constructed that does not depend on a "Q-type complexity assumption".

In 2019, Bitansky showed that VRFs exist if non-interactive witness-indistinguishable proofs (that is, weaker versions of non-interactive zero-knowledge proofs for NP problems that only hide the witness that the prover uses), non-interactive cryptographic commitments, and single-key constrained pseudorandom functions (that is, pseudorandom functions that only allow the user to evaluate the function with a preset constrained subset of possible inputs) also do.

In 2020, Esgin et al. proposed a post-quantum secure VRF based on lattice-based cryptography.

Uses and applications

VRFs provide deterministic pre-commitments for low entropy inputs which must be resistant to brute-force pre-image attacks. VRFs can be used for defense against offline enumeration attacks (such as dictionary attacks) on data stored in hash-based data structures.

In protocol design 
VRFs have been used to make:

 Resettable zero-knowledge proofs (i.e. one that remains zero-knowledge even if a malicious verifier is allowed to reset the honest prover and query it again) with three rounds in the bare model
 Non-interactive lottery systems
 Verifiable transaction escrow schemes
Updatable zero-knowledge databases
E-cash
VRFs can also be used to implement random oracles.

In Internet security 
DNSSEC is a system that prevents attackers from tampering with Domain Name System messages, but it also suffers from the vulnerability of zone enumeration. The proposed NSEC5 system, which uses VRFs, provably prevents this type of attack.

In cryptocurrency 
Cardano and Polkadot implement VRFs for block production.

The Internet Computer cryptocurrency uses a VRF to produce a decentralized random beacon whose output is unpredictable to anyone until they become available to everyone. More precisely, its protocol allows clients to agree on a VRF (i.e. a commitment to a deterministic pseudorandom sequence) and to produce one new output thereof every round by using threshold signatures and distributed key generation. 

Algorand uses VRFs to perform cryptographic sortition. In this platform, every block produces a new random selection seed, and a user secretly checks whether they were selected to participate in the consensus protocol by evaluating a VRF with their secret participation key and the selection seed. (This also produces a proof, which the user can send to anyone to show that they have been selected to participate.) Thusly, accounts are selected to propose blocks for a given round. In this manner, VRFs prevent users from gaining staking advantages by registering multiple accounts. The particular VRF that Algorand uses is based on elliptic-curve cryptography, specifically Curve25519; proposed by Sharon Goldberg, Moni Naor, Dimitris Papadopoulos, Leonid Reyzin, and Jan Včelák, the function is currently undergoing standardization as an IETF Internet Draft. Algorand's own implementation of this function has been open-source since October 2018.

VRFs based on elliptic curve cryptography have been implemented in the programming language Solidity.

In May 2020, Chainlink announced that it launched Chainlink VRF, a service that uses verifiable random functions to generate verifiable randomness on-chain. To use Chainlink VRF, a smart contract supplies a seed (which should be unpredictable to the oracles to whom it is provided), and the seed in turn is used to generate a random number that is sent back to the contract; this is published on-chain along with a proof and verified using the oracle's public key and the application's seed. Each oracle, when generating randomness, uses its own secret key.

In July 2021, Harmony, a cryptocurrency project that bridges between blockchains, and Oraichain, a cryptocurrency project involving artificial intelligence, announced that they had introduced VRFs.

In February 2022, Switchboard, a decentralized oracle protocol, announced the very first verifiable random function (VRF) on the Solana blockchain. The Switchboard VRF is inspired and modelled after Algorand's VRF.

References

Cryptographic algorithms
Cryptographic primitives
Pseudorandomness